Badruddin Umar (born 20 December 1931) is a Bangladeshi Marxist–Leninist theorist, political activist, historian, writer, intellectual and leader of the Communist Party of Bangladesh (Marxist–Leninist) (Umar). His father, Abul Hashim, was a prominent politician in the Indian subcontinent.

Early life, education, and career
Umar was born in Bardhaman, Bengal Presidency, British India. Although his father Abul Hashim, a clandestine Communist, opposed the creation of East Pakistan, Hashim decided to move to East Pakistan and settled in Dhaka in 1950. Umar received his MA in philosophy from University of Dhaka and his BA Honors degree in Philosophy, Politics and Economics (PPE) from University of Oxford. Umar began his academic career as a teacher at University of Dhaka on a temporary basis. In 1963, he joined Rajshahi University as the founder-chair of the political science department. He also founded the department of sociology at the same university, but he resigned from his university positions during the hostile times of the then East Pakistan governor Abdul Monem Khan to become increasingly more active and engaged as a full-time leftist political activist and public intellectual to fight for the cause of oppressed peasants and workers in Bangladesh.

Political activism
As a follower of Marxist–Leninist principles, Umar began writing anti-colonial articles from the 1970s. In the 1960s he wrote three groundbreaking books—Sampradayikata (Communalism, 1966), Sanskritir Sankat (The Crisis of Culture, 1967), and Sanskritik Sampradayikata (Cultural Communalism, 1969)—that theorise the dialectics of the political culture of 'communalism' and the question of Bengali nationalism, thus making significant intellectual contributions to the growth of Bengali nationalism itself.  
In 1969, Umar joined the East Pakistan Communist Party, and from February 1970 to March 1971, Umar edited the mouthpiece of the East Pakistan Communist Party—Shaptahik Ganashakti—which published essays and articles about the problems and prospects of the communist movement in Pakistan.
He was president of both Bangladesh Krishak Federation (Bangladesh Peasant Federation) and Bangladesh Lekhak Shibir—the country's oldest organisation of progressive writers, intellectuals, and cultural activists. Currently he is President of the Jatiya Mukti Council (National Liberation Council).

Books
Umar has written nearly a hundred books and countless articles. The majority of his books discuss the problems and possibilities of the democratic and socialist transformation of class society. He lucidly and thoroughly exposes the lumpenbourgeoisie's political culture in Bangladesh. 
In his books he discusses a wide range of issues including the political economy and culture of capitalism, world socialist movements, communist movements in Bangladesh, the phenomena of militarism and military dictatorships in the Third World, criminalisation of politics, business, and so on. His book titled Poverty Trade engages with the ideas of Dr. Muhammad Yunus and provides a critique of his concept and practice of micro-credit. Umar also researched on Bengali Language Movement and published a book on this topic.

Bibliography
 Umar, Badruddin Amara Jibana: 1931–1950 (Hardcover, Sahityika)
 Umar, Badruddin Banaladese Ganatantrika Svairatantra  (Maola Bradarsa)
 Umar, Badruddin Banaladese Samsadiya Ganatantra  (Sahityika)
 Umar, Badruddin Banaladesera artha-Rajanaitika Paristhiti  (Jatiya Grantha Prakasana)
 Umar, Badruddin Dvitiya Aoyami Liga Sarakarera amale Banaladesa  (Jatiya Anubhaba Prakasana)
 Umar, Badruddin Ganaadalata, Asamapta Mukhti Samgramera Jera  (Mira Prakasana)
 Umar, Badruddin Nirbacita Rajanaitika Prabandha  (Subarna)
 Umar, Badruddin Sakhinara Candrakala  (Ekuse Bamla Prakasana)
 Umar, Badruddin Siksha O siksha andolana (Srabana)
 Umar, Badruddin The Emergence of Bangladesh: Class and Political Struggles in East Pakistan, 1947–1958 (Oxford University Press)
 Umar, Badruddin The Emergence of Bangladesh Vol. 2: The Rise of Bengali Nationalism, 1958–1971 (Oxford University Press)
 Umar, Badruddin Indian National Movement: R. R. M. Roy Memorial Lecture, 1984 (University Press, Limited)
 Umar, Badruddin Language Movement in East Bengal (Jatiya Grontha Prakashan)
 Umar, Badruddin "samskritir sankata"  1st published in 1967 by Srabon Prokashoni,()

References

External links
The Emergence of Bangladesh
A People’s History of The Language Movement
New platform to fight against fascism
সংবাদপত্রে প্রকাশিত বদরুদ্দীন উমরের কয়েকটি লেখা
Azfar Hussain's essay on Badruddin Umar in The Daily Star
Azfar Hussain pays tribute to Badruddin Umar on his 89th birthday

Bangladesi
Bangladeshi essayists
Bangladeshi political writers
Bangladeshi politicians
Marxist theorists
Living people
1931 births
20th-century Bangladeshi philosophers
Bangladeshi people of Indian descent
People from Purba Bardhaman district
Writers from West Bengal